Vannie Bockarie (born 18 January 1975) is a Sierra Leonean footballer. He played in one match for the Sierra Leone national football team in 1997. He was also named in Sierra Leone's squad for the 1994 African Cup of Nations tournament.

References

External links
 

1975 births
Living people
Sierra Leonean footballers
Sierra Leone international footballers
1994 African Cup of Nations players
Place of birth missing (living people)
Association football defenders